North Lake is a lake located by Atwell, New York and is the source of the Black River. North Lake is one of several lakes in Herkimer County that has a medium acid content, and is therefore not a big fish producer. The fish species present are tiger muskie, white sucker, perch, and bullhead. Boating is permitted, limited to a small gravel based boat launch in Atwell.

The 11,490-acre North Lake Easement Tract (also known as the J.P. Lewis Tract), is located in the Town of Ohio in Herkimer County. It is currently owned by Heartwood Forestry Fund. The tract surrounds the northern portion of North Lake and is bounded by the Black River Wild Forest on the southwest and the West Canada Lakes Wilderness on the northeast. The tract has the same rolling topography and features characteristic of adjacent forest preserve lands. Besides the lake, the tract includes numerous creeks, brooks and ponds. 2,606-foot Canachagala Mountain and 2,391-foot Golden Stair Mountain are located in the northwestern portion of the tract. NOTE: The public is prohibited from trespassing on the private property exclusion areas around the 35 camps on the North Lake Easement Tract.

References 

Lakes of Herkimer County, New York